St Barnabas is a parish church in the Church of England in Balsall Heath, Birmingham, England.

History

The church was built between 1898 and 1904 to designs of the architect Thomas Proud, and was consecrated by Charles Gore, Bishop of Worcester on Saturday 10 June 1904. It acquired its own parish in 1905 with land taken from St Paul's Church, Balsall Heath.

A fire in 1970 resulted in an extensive rebuild. In 1990 the church was merged with St Agatha's Church, Sparkbrook to form a united parish. The parish stands in the Anglo-Catholic tradition of the Church of England: as it rejects the ordination of women, it receives alternative episcopal oversight from the Bishop of Ebbsfleet (currently Jonathan Goodall).

References

Church of England church buildings in Birmingham, West Midlands
Churches completed in 1904
20th-century Church of England church buildings
Balsall Heath